Slow Love may refer to:

Music
"Slow Love", an unofficially released song by Beyoncé
 "Slow Love", a song by Prince from Sign "O" the Times
 "Slow Love", an album by Gino Vannelli

Literature
 Slow Love: How I Lost my Job, Put on My Pajamas, and Found Happiness, a 2010 book by Dominique Browning

Television
 "Slow Love", an episode of Adventure Time